The M'Clintock Formation is a geologic formation in Nunavut. It preserves fossils dating back to the Ordovician period.

See also

 List of fossiliferous stratigraphic units in Nunavut

References
 

Ordovician Nunavut